The fifth season of Top Chef Masters was announced on May 16, 2013. Gail Simmons appeared as the new head critic for the competition. In addition, Lesley Suter, the food and dining editor for Los Angeles Magazine, joined the judging panel alongside James Oseland, Ruth Reichl, and Francis Lam. The season premiered on July 24, 2013, with 13 award-winning chefs competing in weekly challenges to win the grand prize of $100,000 (USD) for their charity and the title of "Top Chef Master".

Each Top Chef Masters contestant had their sous-chef compete in a series of separate challenges called the "Battle of the Sous Chefs". Hosted by regular Top Chef judge Hugh Acheson, the results of each webisode directly impacted the competitors of the main competition. The winner of each round rewarded their respective head chef with immunity from elimination, while the sous-chefs with the lowest performances earned them a disadvantage, such as less time to prep or shop for ingredients.

Contestants
13 established chefs, along with their selected sous-chefs, competed in the fifth season of Top Chef Masters. Bryan Voltaggio originally competed in Top Chef: Las Vegas, the sixth season of the original Top Chef series. David Burke previously competed in the second season of Top Chef Masters, while Sue Zemanick appeared in the show's third season. Sous-chef Jorel Pierce vied for a spot on Top Chef: Seattle, the tenth season of Top Chef, but was eliminated during the qualifying rounds.

Contestant Progress

: Eliminated by placing last in the Quickfire Challenge.
: Jennifer beat Sue in the subsequent Battle of the Sous Chefs to return to the competition.
 (WINNER) The chef won the season and was crowned Top Chef: Master.
 (RUNNER-UP) The chef was a runner-up for the season.
 (WIN) The chef won that episode's Elimination Challenge.
 (HIGH) The chef was selected as one of the top entries in the Elimination Challenge, but did not win.
 (IN) The chef neither won nor lost that week's Elimination Challenge. They also were not up to be eliminated.
 (LOW) The chef was selected as one of the bottom entries in the Elimination Challenge, but was not eliminated.
 (OUT) The chef lost that week's Elimination Challenge and was eliminated.

Battle of the Sous Chefs

: Jorel and Jennifer beat Nick and Sue to stay in the competition.  No immunity was awarded.
: No immunity was awarded for the finale.
 (WIN) The sous-chef won the round, earning immunity for their head chef in the main competition.
 (HIGH) The chef was selected as one of the top entries in the challenge, but did not win.
 (IN) The sous-chef neither won nor lost the round.
 (LOW) The sous-chef was selected as one of the bottom entries of the round, giving their head chef a disadvantage in the main competition.
 (OUT) The head chef was ousted from the main competition in the previous episode, eliminating their respective sous-chef.
 (WD) The chef withdrew from the competition.

Episodes

Episode 1: Sous Chefs and Skydives
Battle of the Sous Chefs: The sous chefs must make a dish that embodies their Top Chef Master's culinary style in 45 minutes.
WINNER: Drew (Seared Scallop with Hon Shemeji Mushrooms & Shiitake Broth)
ADVANTAGE: Immunity (Douglas)
Bottom: Chris, Lora, Greg
DISADVANTAGE: Top Chef Master can not use their knives; only a standard table setting may be used in its place (David, Lynn, Richard)
Judge: Hugh

Elimination Challenge: The chefs must prepare a family style dinner for the SkyHawks Parachute Team.  Each chef must choose if they want to travel to the site via car or by skydiving.  If they skydive, they will have 2 hours to cook, but if they drive they will have only 1 hour.  All of the chefs except Douglas decide to jump.  After this, the chefs find out that they will only get to use the same ingredients in their dishes as their sous chefs used in the sous chef battle.  They also find out that Douglas has won the immunity from his sous chef's performance and that David, Lynn and Richard will not learn their disadvantage until they arrive.  The winner earns $10,000 for their charity.
WINNER: Odette (Cold Roast Lamb with Cauliflower & Anchovy Salad)
ELIMINATED: Herbert (Grilled Mango-Cucumber Butter & Red Pepper Gazpacho, Note: missing Oysters)
Judges: Gail, James, Leslie, The SkyHawks
Original Airdate: July 24, 2013
 Ratings: 945,000 (0.4 18-49 rating)

Episode 2: Asian Night Market
Battle of the Sous Chefs: the Mise en Place race.  The sous chefs must prepare pomegranate, celery root, squid, and 3 cuts of lamb.
WINNER: Ted
ADVANTAGE: Immunity (Sang)
DISADVANTAGE: All other Top Chef Masters must finish the Mise en Place before they may begin cooking.

Elimination Quickfire: The chefs must prepare a dish in 30 minutes using the Mise en Place ingredients.  The winner earns $5,000 for their charity.
Top: Sang, Sue, Jenn
WINNER: Sue (Seared Lamb Loin, Celery Root Purée, Fennel Pomegranate Slaw & Crispy Calamari)
Bottom: Lynn, Odette, Richard
ELIMINATED: Richard (Lamb Tartare, Calamari Salad, Pomegranate Jicama & Micro Green Salad)
Judge: Gail

Elimination Challenge: The chefs must put an Asian twist on an American classic at the 626 Asian Night Market .  The chefs have 2 hours to prepare and cook on site before service begins for 200 guests.  The chefs will be assisted by their sous chefs.  The winner earns $10,000 for their charity.
WINNER: Sang (Fried Shrimp Head & Poached Tail with Chili Garlic Aioli & Burmese Cabbage Slaw)
ELIMINATED: Jenn (Banh Mi with Pork Meatballs, Chili Mayo and Cilantro-Cucumber Salad)
Judges: Kathie Lee Gifford, Gail, James, Francis
Original Airdate: July 31, 2013
 Ratings: 1,093,000 (0.5 18-49 rating)

Episode 3: Sex, Greed and Murder
Battle of the Sous Chefs: The sous chefs must create a dish that highlights sausage in 45 minutes.
WINNER: Lora
ADVANTAGE: Immunity (Lynn)
Bottom: Graeme, Vinson, Ted
DISADVANTAGE: Loss of 30 minutes of prep time in the Elimination Challenge (Bryan, Franklin, Sang)
Judge: Hugh

Quickfire: The chefs must make a dish in 30 minutes using the scraps left over from the sausage challenge as their only protein.  The winner earns $5,000 for their charity.
Top: Neal, Douglas, Sang
WINNER: Sang (Spicy Pork Larb with Cabbage & Thai Chilies)
Bottom: Lynn, Sue
Judges: Amelia Posada and Erika Nakamura, Owners of Lindy & Grundy butcher shop

Elimination Challenge: The chefs will be cooking for the cast of Days of Our Lives who have just completed their 12,000th episode.  The chefs must create a dish that best represents one of the 3 cornerstones of Soap opera plotlines, Sex, Greed and Murder.  With immunity, Lynn gets her choice of plot.  The chefs with each plot compete against each other, with the judges picking a winner and which chef will be up for elimination from each plot.  The winner earns $10,000 for their charity.
Sex: Neal, David, Franklin, Lynn
Greed: Douglas, Bryan, Sue
Murder: Odette, Jennifer, Sang
WINNER: Jennifer (Seared Duck Breast & Citrus-Chili Duck Sausage with Fregola & Celery Salad)
ELIMINATED: Odette (Mushroom & Soft Egg Yolk Filled Raviolo)
Judges: Gail, Ruth, Lesley, Cast (Shawn Christian, Peggy McCay, Deidre Hall, Camila Banus, Drake Hogestyn, Bryan Dattilo, Arianne Zucker, Galen Gering, James Reynolds)
Original Airdate: August 7, 2013
 Ratings: 1,151,000 (0.4 18-49 rating)

Episode 4: Curtis' Surprise Party
Battle of the Sous Chefs: The sous chefs must create a dish using ingredients selected by their Top Chef Master in 45 minutes.  No pantry ingredients may be used.
WINNER: Drew (Maine Lobster with Thai Vinaigrette, Mango & Avocado)
ADVANTAGE: Immunity (Douglas)
Bottom: Lora, Graeme, Ted
DISADVANTAGE: Loss of 15 minutes shopping time in the Elimination Challenge. (Lynn, Bryan, Sang)
Judge: Hugh

Quickfire: The chefs must make a curry dish in 30 minutes.  The chefs must develop their own curry mix and pair it with a Goose Island beer. The winner earns $5,000 for their charity.
Top: Lynn, Sang
WINNER: Sang (Thai Yellow Curry with Kaffir Lime & Chicken Thighs, paired with Sofie beer)
Bottom: Douglas, Franklin
Judge: Jason Bentley (Music Director of KCRW Radio)

Elimination Challenge: The chefs are initially told by James that he is holding a Global Tasting for Saveur magazine and that they will provide the food.  The chefs are broken into 3 teams of 3 chefs each.  One team is made up of the chefs with the disadvantage and Douglas (with immunity) gets to pick the other 2 members of his team.  When Curtis leaves the room to allow the chefs to menu plan with James, it is revealed that the chefs will actually be catering a surprise engagement party hosted by Curtis' fiancée, Lindsay Price.  The chefs are given 30 minutes to shop and 2 hours to cook.  Each chef must create their own dish and each team must create a dessert. The winning team's chefs each earn $5,000 for their charity.
Blue Team - Lynn, Sang, Bryan
Green Team - Franklin, Neal, Jennifer
Red Team - David, Douglas, Sue
WINNING TEAM: Red
LOSING TEAM: Green
ELIMINATED: Franklin (Salmon with Citrus, Avocado & Cucumber & Pink Sake Guava Coconut Cocktail. Ricotta Chocolate Donuts)
Judges: James, Gail, Ruth
Original Airdate: August 14, 2013
 Ratings: 1,018,000 (0.4 18-49 rating)

Episode 5: Restaurant Wars
Battle of the Sous Chefs: The sous chefs must create a dish judged against a competitor using an identical basket of ingredients in 30 minutes.
Green basket: Jason defeats Chris
Red basket: Jorel defeats Nick
Yellow basket: Lora defeats Drew
Blue basket: Graeme defeats Ted
WINNER: Jason (Sardines & Liver Wrapped in Chicken Skin with Plantain Pine Nut Butter)
ADVANTAGE: Immunity (Neal)
DISADVANTAGE: The Top Chef Masters will not have the assistance of their sous chef in the Elimination Challenge. (David, Sue, Douglas, Sang)
Judge: Hugh

Elimination Challenge: The chefs partner with Busy Philipps to bring to life a restaurant idea she's had for years, to take the segregated food of Los Angeles and put it together in one place.  The chefs are broken into 2 teams, based on whose sous chefs won and lost the battle.  The sous chefs who won their battles will assist their top chefs for 2 hours of prep time.  Each team has $4,000 to shop and 45 minutes to menu plan.  The winner earns $10,000 for their charity.
 "Artisan" Team: Neal, Jennifer, Bryan, Lynn
 "72 & Sunny" Team: David, Sue, Douglas, Sang
 WINNING TEAM: "72 & Sunny"
WINNER: Sang (Strip Loin with Broccoli Two Ways, Puffed Tendon & Black Bean Ghee)
 LOSING TEAM: "Artisan"
ELIMINATED: Lynn (Chocolate Brownie Sundae with Roasted Banana Ice Cream & Peanut Caramel Sauce)
Judges: Gail, Ruth, Francis, Busy, Dana Cowin
Note: After the elimination, it is revealed to Douglas that Drew has had a family emergency and must leave the competition.
Original Airdate: August 21, 2013
 Ratings: 953,000 (0.4 18-49 rating)

Episode 6: Mindy Kaling and Yo Gabba Gabba!
 Battle of the Sous Chefs: It is revealed that Drew has been replaced by Paul due to a family emergency.  The sous chefs must create a dish that highlights the onion in 45 minutes.  It is also revealed that in the next elimination challenge, 2 Top Chef Masters will be eliminated.
 WINNER: Chris (Spring Onion Flan with Sweet & Sour Onions & Chicken Liver)
 ADVANTAGE: Immunity (David)
 Bottom: Nick, Jason, Jorel
 DISADVANTAGE: The Top Chef Masters will not have assistance of their sous chefs for the last 30 minutes of preparation during the Elimination Challenge.  They must also incorporate an additional ingredient of Brussels Sprouts into their dish. (Sue, Neal, Jennifer)
 Judges: Hugh, Curtis

 Quickfire: The chefs must prepare a dish in 30 minutes inspired by the favorite romantic comedies of judge Mindy Kaling. The winner earns $5,000 for their charity.
 Top: Neal, Douglas, Sue
 WINNER: Douglas (Scrambled Eggs & Caviar with Pommes Frites)
 Bottom: Sang, Jennifer
 Judge: Mindy Kaling

 Elimination Challenge: The chefs must cook a dish for kids and adults using ingredients that kids do not like. This is based on an idea from the song "Party In My Tummy" by DJ Lance and the cast of Yo Gabba Gabba!.
 WINNER: Neal (Pasta with Brussels Sprout & Spinach Bolognese)
 ELIMINATED: Sue (Mac & Cheese with Maple Glazed Brussels Sprouts & Bacon), and Jennifer (Melon Yogurt Parfait "Sandwich" with Pickled Brussels Sprouts & Mint)
 Judges: Francis, Ruth, Gail
Note: After the elimination, it is revealed that Jennifer and Sue will complete in Battle of the Sous Chefs with the chance for one of them to return to the competition.
 Original Airdate: August 28, 2013
 Ratings: 849,000 (0.4 18-49 rating)

Episode 7: Catch of the Day
 Battle of the Sous Chefs: Jennifer and Sue are given the opportunity to re-enter the competition with the help of their Sous Chefs.  They must prepare a dish in 30 minutes showcasing a protein found on the bottom of the sea.  The episode ends before the winner is revealed.
 WINNER: Jennifer & Jorel (Catfish with Coconut Cauliflower Purée & Lentil Vinaigrette)
 ELIMINATED: Sue & Nick (Cornmeal-Crusted Catfish with Corn Maque Choux & Crawfish Tails)
 Judges: Francis, Hugh

 Quickfire: The chefs must prepare their take on Nachos in 30 minutes. The winner earns $5,000 for their charity as well as immunity.
 Top: Bryan, Douglas
 WINNER: Douglas (Deconstructed nacho: Shrimp with Powdered Nacho Chips, Cheese, Beans & Salsa Consommé)
 Bottom: Sang, David
 Judge: Ali Larter

 Elimination Challenge: The chefs must cook a dish that has both hot and cold seafood preparation. The chefs get 30 minutes to shop all but the seafood protein itself. The protein is revealed the next day. The chefs have to pair up in a team of two: Jennifer and Douglas (John Dory), Bryan and Sang (sablefish) and Neal and David (sea bass). The chefs have to serve 60 guests in Duke's Restaurant, Malibu. The winners each earn $5,000 for their charity.
 WINNER: Douglas and Jennifer (John Dory Two Ways: Kimchi Cured John Dory with Crispy John Dory & Cucumbers)
 ELIMINATED: Neal (Local Sea Bass Crudo with Citrus Tomato Pepper Vinaigrette)
 Judges: Francis, James, Gail
 Original Airdate: September 4, 2013
 Ratings: 971,000 Viewers (0.4 18-49 rating)

Episode 8: Lucha Vavoom
 Battle of the Sous Chefs: The sous chefs must create a dish in 30 minutes that highlights a mistake they made working in their Top Chef Master's kitchen and how they learned from it.
 WINNER: Paul (Red Wine Risotto, Crispy Chicken Thigh & Parmesan Froth)
 ADVANTAGE: Immunity (Douglas)
 Bottom: Ted, Jorel
 DISADVANTAGE: The Top Chef Masters will exchange sous chefs during the final prep and service during the Elimination Challenge. (Sang, Jennifer)
 Judge: Hugh

 Quickfire: Douglas gets to pick the challenge because his sous chef won the preceding battle.  The chefs must create a dish that highlights ketchup in 20 minutes.  The winner earns $5,000 for their charity.
 Top: Bryan, Jennifer, Sang
 WINNER: Jennifer (Scallop with Ketchup Sauce, Fermented Black Beans, Avocados & Blood Orange)
 Bottom: David, Douglas
 Judge: Daniel Handler

 Elimination Challenge: The chefs must create a 2-item Mexican menu for 300 guests at a Lucha VaVOOM event.  The chefs have 3 hours to prep the day before and 1 hour at the event.  At the event, Sang must work with Jennifer's sous, Jorel; while Jennifer must work with Sang's sous, Ted.  The winner earns $10,000 for their charity.
 WINNER: Jennifer (Shrimp, Bass & Scallop Ceviche with Papaya, Mango, Pineapple & Plantain Crisp; Guajillo Chile Posole with Shared Cabbage, Lime, Cilantro & Queso Fresco)
 ELIMINATED: Sang (Thai-Style Shrimp Cocktail with Avocado Foam & Tortilla Strips; Pork Barbacoa with Sweet Corn Sope & Radish Cabbage Slaw)
 Judges: Lesley, Gail, Jane Goldman - founder of chow.com
 Original Airdate: September 11, 2013

Episode 9: Teacher Tribute
 Battle of the Sous Chefs: The sous chefs must create a dish in 30 minutes that has been conceived by their Top Chef Master.
 WINNER: Graeme (Steak, Potatoes, Creamed Spinach & Mushrooms)
 ADVANTAGE: Immunity and automatic spot in the Finale (Bryan)
 Judge: Hugh

 Quickfire: The chef who makes the best burger in 30 minutes earns $5,000 for their charity.
 Top: David, Jennifer
 WINNER: Jennifer (Beef Burger with Caramelized Bacon, Shiitake Ponzu Slaw & Siracha Ketchup)
 Bottom: Douglas, Bryan
 Judge: Sang

 Elimination Challenge: The chefs must create a dish to honor one of 4 teachers at a dinner for the Los Angeles Unified School District.  The winner earns $10,000 for their charity.
 WINNER: Bryan (Calamari Bolognese with Miso, Cavatelli, Bacon & Squid Ink)
 ELIMINATED: David (Bittersweet Chocolate Soufflé with Orange Peel & Raspberry Sauce)
 Judges: James, Gail, Alan Richman
 Original Airdate: September 18, 2013

Episode 10: Finale

 Battle of the Sous Chefs: The sous chefs must create a dessert to be served in their Top Chef Master's Finale meal based on their first day with their Top Chef Master.  The winner earns $10,000 for their charity.
 WINNER: Graeme  (Coconut Pudding & Sorbet with Greek Yogurt & Lavender Powder)
 Bottom: Paul (Greek Yogurt Panna Cotta, Compressed Mango & Thai Herb Ice)
 DISADVANTAGE: Will not be able to assist their Top Chef Master in the first day of prep. (Douglas)
 Judge: James, Hugh

Elimination Challenge: Create Something Old, New, Borrowed, and Sous
Bryan:
Groat Salad with Dungeness Crab, Asparagus, Hen Egg Custard, and Chicken Skin
Black Cod with Onion Dashi, Date, and Parsnip Puree, and Green Apple 
Braised Beef Cheek and New York Strip with Seaweed Potatoes and Maitake Mushrooms 
Coconut, Lavender, and Vanilla 
Douglas:
Soup Billi Bi with White Wine, Saffron, Fennel Puree, and Uni 
Soba Wrapped Ocean Trout, Ginger Dashi, and Groats
Duck Breast with Sake Roasted Daikon, Tamarind, Golden Pea Sprouts, and Dates 
Black Sesame Panna Cotta, Shattered miso Custard, and Green Tea Matcha 
Jennifer:
Potato-Sunchoke Galette with Salmon, Caviar, Pickled Apple, and Creme Fraiche 
Paella Gnocchi with Chicken Meatballs, Mussels, and Shrimp 
Chinese Duck with Shiitake Broth, Eggplant Daikon, Grilled Bok Choy, and Duck Wonton 
Smoked Macadamia with Chocolate Bavarian Napoleon, Tapioca, and Milk Caramel
WINNER: Douglas
Original Airdate: September 25, 2013

References

2013 American television seasons
Masters, Season 5